The Shire of Aurukun is a local government area in Far North Queensland, Australia. The shire covers part of western Cape York Peninsula, the most northerly section of the Australian mainland.

History 
According to the earliest records, Cape Keerweer, located on the Gulf of Carpentaria coast, was the first site where Europeans wished to settle in Australia. A Dutch ship with Captain Willem Janszoon was the first recorded Dutch landing at Cape Keerweer. Captain Janszoon wanted to build a city at the site but the exploitative action of his crew led to a fight between the local Aboriginal people and the sailors. It resulted in the killing of various crew members and the ship had to leave.

The territory of the Shire of Aurukun was previously an Aboriginal reserve administered under the Queensland Aboriginals Protection and Restriction of the Sale of Opium Act 1897 by the Presbyterian Church. The Aurukun Mission was established in 1904 and Aboriginal people from all over Cape York were relocated there.

In 1978, the land was taken over by the Queensland Government, who enacted the Local Government (Aboriginal Lands) Act 1978, proclaimed the Shire of Aurukun and granted to it Aboriginal Land Lease No. 1. An elected council lasted just one month and an administrator was appointed. The State's media at the time generally was of the opinion that bauxite revenues were a major factor in the Government's decision making on the issue.

In the 1990s, an elected council once again took charge.

Towns and localities 
The Shire of Aurukun includes the following settlement:

 Aurukun

Language  

Aurukun is known as part of the Wik Nation. The location of Aurukun has the Wik Mungkan Tribe as traditional custodians and is known as a strong First Nations community. It is the last Aboriginal community in Queensland who have a traditional language (Wik Mungkan) as a thriving and strong first language, with more than 1200 hundred fluent speakers from children to elders. Many cultural-based programs, incorporating the five Wik Language Groups have been facilitated from the local Indigenous Knowledge Centre (IKC); This includes the Kaap Thonam: Woyan-Min Biocultural Project App (the Biocultural Project). 

In 2022, the Biocultural Project was led by Perry Yunkaporta, Wik Elder and Apelech Clan songman and traditional owner and included Noel Waterman, Aurukun IKC Coordinator and Gabe Waterman, Wik and Kugu Art Centre Manager. Engaging the community, they developed the software application 'Kaap Thonam, a Wik Seasons Calendar', teaching important knowledge of Aurukun's seven seasons. Perry Yunkaporta has been working on the Biocultural Project at the Wik Mungkan IKC in Aurukun for several years, contributing his rich linguistic expertise and cultural knowledge in leading learning on country activities with students from the local school.

Libraries 

The Aurukun Shire Council operates the Wik Mungkan Indigenous Knowledge Centre in Aurukun, in partnership with the State Library of Queensland.  This was the sixth IKC to open, on 22 November 2002. The council has operated the IKC for 20 years, with periods of closure for various reasons. The IKC currently offers library services, as well as a location for the Aurukun Flexi Learning Centre which focuses on culturally based learning, including Wik language classes.

Population
The population of the Shire of Aurukun, along with Cook, Torres and Mornington, have been singled out by the Australian Bureau of Statistics (ABS), who conduct the quinquennial census, as particularly difficult to measure accurately. Reasons for this include cultural and language barriers, transport and geographical spread of the population, who are mostly located in isolated communities. As such, all figures are likely to be lower than the actual population on the census date.

Chairs and mayors

References

External links
 

 
Local government areas of Queensland
1878 establishments in Australia